Charles Edwards may refer to:

 Charles Edwards (1933–1989), African American blues harmonica player; known as Good Rockin' Charles
 Charles Edwards (Labour politician) (1867–1954), Labour Member of Parliament for Bedwellty, 1918–1950
 Charles Edwards (Liberal politician) (1825–1889), Member of Parliament for Windsor
 Charles Edwards (actor) (born 1969), English actor
 Charles Edwards (English cricketer) (1884–1938), English cricketer
 Charles Edwards (footballer) (1854–1943), Wrexham F.C. and Wales international footballer
 Charles Edwards (journalist) (1906–1983), Canadian journalist and news agency executive
 Charles Edwards (New Zealand cricketer) (1856–1924), New Zealand cricketer
 Charles Edwards (Rastafari) (1915–1994), influential leader of the Rastafari movement and head of the Bobo Shanti mansion
 Charles Edwards (stage designer) (born 1965), English opera designer and director
 Charles Edwards (writer) (1628?–1691?), Welsh writer and preacher
 Charlie Edwards (boxer) (born 1993), British boxer
 Charles C. Edwards (1923–2011), American physician
 Charles Gordon Edwards (1878–1931), U.S. politician from the state of Georgia
 Charles Lincoln Edwards (1863–1937), American zoologist
 Charles Marcus Edwards, confessed Klansman
 Charles Uzzell-Edwards (born 1968), Welsh graffiti artist
 Charlie Edwards (character), fictional character in British series, Hotel Babylon
 Bud Edwards (Charles Halleck Edwards, 1908–1986), American football player
 Charles Martin Edwards (born 1945), chairman of Manchester United
 Chuck Edwards (Charles Marion Edwards, born 1960), American politician from North Carolina

See also